In mathematics, Hurwitz's theorem is a theorem of Adolf Hurwitz (1859–1919), published posthumously in 1923, solving the Hurwitz problem for finite-dimensional unital real non-associative algebras endowed with a positive-definite quadratic form. The theorem states that if the quadratic form defines a homomorphism into the positive real numbers on the non-zero part of the algebra, then the algebra must be isomorphic to the real numbers, the complex numbers, the quaternions, or the octonions. Such algebras, sometimes called Hurwitz algebras, are examples of composition algebras.

The theory of composition algebras has subsequently been generalized to arbitrary quadratic forms and arbitrary fields. Hurwitz's theorem implies that multiplicative formulas for sums of squares can only occur in 1, 2, 4 and 8 dimensions, a result originally proved by Hurwitz in 1898. Hurwitz's theorem has been applied in algebraic topology to problems on vector fields on spheres and the homotopy groups of the classical groups and in quantum mechanics to the classification of simple Jordan algebras.

Euclidean Hurwitz algebras

Definition
A Hurwitz algebra or composition algebra is a finite-dimensional not necessarily associative algebra  with identity endowed with a nondegenerate quadratic form  such that .

Evidently the involution has period two and preserves the inner product and norm. These operators have the following properties:

 the involution is an antiautomorphism, i.e. 
 
  if 
 

These properties are proved starting from the polarized version of the identity :

Hence .

Similarly .

Hence , so that .

By the polarized identity  so . Applied to 1 this gives . Replacing  by  gives the other identity.

The formula  is proved analogically.

Classification
It is routine to check that the real numbers , the complex numbers  and the quaternions  are examples of associative Euclidean Hurwitz algebras with their standard norms and involutions. There are moreover natural inclusions .

Analysing such an inclusion leads to the Cayley–Dickson construction, formalized by A.A. Albert. Let  be a Euclidean Hurwitz algebra and  a proper unital subalgebra, so a Euclidean Hurwitz algebra in its own right. Since , it follows that  and hence . It is unital and is again a Euclidean Hurwitz algebra. It satisfies the following Cayley–Dickson multiplication laws:

The formula for the involution follows. To show that  is closed under multiplication . Since  is orthogonal to 1, .

  taking adjoints above.

which leads to

Hence , so that  must be associative.

This recovers the usual definition of the octonions or Cayley numbers. If  is a Euclidean algebra, it must contain . If it is larger still, it must contain . But there the process must stop, because  is not associative.

 The only Euclidean Hurwitz algebras are the real numbers, the complex numbers, the quaternions and the octonions.

Other proofs
In fact the operators  with  satisfy  and so form a real Clifford algebra. If  is a unit vector, then  is skew-adjoint with square . So  must be either even or 1 (in which case  contains no unit vectors orthogonal to 1). If  is even,  is odd, so the Clifford algebra has exactly two complex irreducible representations of dimension . So this power of 2 must divide . It is easy to see that this implies  can only be 1, 2, 4 or 8.

The proof of  uses the representation theory of finite groups, or the projective representation theory of elementary Abelian 2-groups, known to be equivalent to the representation theory of real Clifford algebras. Indeed, taking an orthonormal basis  of the orthogonal complement of 1 gives rise to operators 
satisfying

This is a projective representation of a direct product of  groups of order 2. ( is assumed to be greater than 1.) The operators  by construction are skew-symmetric and orthogonal. In fact Eckmann constructed operators of this type in a slightly different but equivalent way. Assume that there is a composition law for two forms

Thus

The relations above are equivalent to

Writing

the relations become

Now set .

Since  is an orthogonal matrix with square  on a real vector space,  is even.

Let  be the finite group generated by elements  such that

where  is central of order 2. Thus there are
The total number of irreducible complex representations is the number of conjugacy classes. So since  is even, there are two further irreducible complex representations. Since the sum of the squares of the dimensions equals  and the dimensions divide , the two irreducibles must have dimension . When  is even, there are two and their dimension must divide the order of the group, so is a power of two, so they must both have dimension . The space on which the 's act can be complexified. It will have complex dimension . If , the dimension is 4, which does not divide 6. So N can only be 1, 2, 4 or 8.

Applications to Jordan algebras
It is a unital nonassociative algebra with an involution given by

. The real-valued trace satisfies:

In  define the associator by

It is trilinear and vanishes identically if  is associative. Since  is an alternative algebra
Polarizing it follows that the associator is antisymmetric in its three entries. Furthermore, if ,  or  lie in  then . These facts imply that  has certain commutation properties.

In fact if , then

Each diagonal

The exceptional Jordan algebra  is called the Albert algebra after A.A. Albert.

So it is an inner product. It satisfies the associativity property  because of the properties of the real trace. The main axiom to check is the Jordan condition for the operators  defined by :

Indeed,

 

so that

Polarizing yields:

Setting , shows that  is skew-adjoint. The derivation property  follows by this and the associativity property of the inner product in the identity above.

It is a closed subgroup of  so a compact Lie group. Its Lie algebra consists of skew-adjoint derivations.  showed that given  in  there is an automorphism  in  such that  is a diagonal matrix. (By self-adjointness the diagonal entries will be real.)

The diagonal entries are real. This derivative is non-zero if . On the other hand, the group  preserves the real-valued trace. However, on the line constant,  has no local maximum (only a global minimum), a contradiction. Hence  must be diagonal.

See also

 Multiplicative quadratic form
 Radon–Hurwitz number
 Frobenius Theorem

Notes

References

 
 

 (reprint of 1951 article)

Further reading

 

 Max Koecher & Reinhold Remmert (1990) "Composition Algebras. Hurwitz's Theorem — Vector-Product Algebras", chapter 10 of Numbers by Heinz-Dieter Ebbinghaus et al., Springer, 

Composition algebras
Non-associative algebras
Quadratic forms
Representation theory
Theorems about algebras
1923 introductions